To fluer i ett smekk (Two Birds with One Stone) is a Norwegian comedy crime film from 1973 directed by Eric Johnson. Johnson also wrote the screenplay.

Plot
Bobla, who has a history of run-ins with the police, has taken a job as a weightlifter at a circus. When one day he discovers the parrot Clara in the open window of Miss Jacobsen, he can not help but steal it. The sick and bedridden woman hears Clara scream, but she thinks that it is Yngve who is playing with it; Yngve sometimes helps her with a little of everything. Today, Yngve has picked up medicine at the pharmacy. Shortly after Bobla has sneaked away, Yngve arrives with Turid and the pony Cæsar. The children look for the parrot and ask Miss Jacobsen if it is in the garden. She is startled and realizes that Clara has disappeared. The children decide to find the parrot.

Cast

 Sverre Wilberg as Streken
 Arild Arnardo as the trainer
 Arne Arnardo as the circus director
 Eva Arnardo as the lady in the basket
 Geir Børresen as Pedersen
 Unni Einertsen as Yngve's mother
 Per Hagelund as the fire chief
 Kristian Henriksen as Baldriansen
 Willie Hoel as Johansen
 Iver Hole as Bobla
 Solveig Johnsen as Miss Jakobsen
 Lille Tom as the clown
 Birger Løvaas as the station master
 Tonje Nygaard as Yngve's sister
 Ragnar Olason as Fredriksen
 Yngve Sandboe as Yngve
 Karl Sigernes as the baker
 Hilde Simensen as Turid
 Arne Solberg as the butcher
 Kjell Stormoen as the speaker
 Aagot Støkken as a lady
 Ulf Wengård as the gardener
 Ingrid Øvre Wiik as a lady

References

External links 
 
 To fluer i ett smekk at the National Library of Norway
 To fluer i ett smekk at Filmfront

1973 films
1970s Norwegian-language films
Norwegian crime comedy films
1973 comedy films
1970s crime comedy films